Hornery is a surname. Notable people with the surname include:

Bob Hornery (1931–2015), Australian actor
Sonia Hornery (born 1961), Australian politician

See also
Horner